The Grand Opera House, commonly referred as The Grand, is a historic opera house located at the corner of High Avenue and Market Street in Oshkosh, Wisconsin, United States. It was built in 1883, designed by William Waters, a local architect, and underwent a major refurbishing in 2009–2010 at an expense of two million dollars. The roof trusses were reinforced, the ceilings were replaced, and a large chandelier was repaired. Additionally a new "Grand Lounge" was added for improved audience services and to smaller events.  Today, the opera house seats 550, hosts nearly 100 public performances a year including community and repertory theater, symphony orchestra, corporate meetings and weddings; it is operated by the non-profit Oshkosh Opera House foundation. The theater was listed on the National Register of Historic Places in 1974.

References

External links

Buildings and structures in Oshkosh, Wisconsin
Tourist attractions in Winnebago County, Wisconsin
National Register of Historic Places in Winnebago County, Wisconsin
Opera houses on the National Register of Historic Places in Wisconsin
Opera houses in Wisconsin